For the famous 14th century battle in Scottish history see Battle of Bannockburn. 

There are several places called Bannockburn.  All are probably named after the original village of Bannockburn near Stirling, Scotland, and were created by settlers from the Scottish diaspora of the 18th and 19th centuries.

 Bannockburn, Illinois, a city in the United States
 Bannockburn, New Zealand, a township and former goldmine in New Zealand
 Bannockburn, Ontario, a community and former goldmine in Canada
 Bannockburn, a suburb of Logan City, in Queensland, Australia
 Bannockburn, a locality near Inverell, in New South Wales, Australia
 Bannockburn, Victoria in Australia
 Bannockburn, a subdivision in southern Austin, Texas
 Bannockburn, Zimbabwe, a small town in Zimbabwe
 Bannockburn, Maryland, a neighborhood of Bethesda, Maryland

See also:
 Bannock Burn, a body of water near Bannockburn, Scotland
 SS Bannockburn, a steamship that vanished on Lake Superior in 1902 and subsequently gained a reputation as a ghost ship.